Athanasius Szeptycki (born as Antoni Alexandrowycz Szeptycki; ; 1686 – 12 December 1746, Lviv) was the "Metropolitan of Kiev, Galicia and all Ruthenia"

On 13 September 1715 Szeptycki was ordained by Primate of the Uniate church Leo Kiszka as a bishop of Lemberg.

Soon after the death of Metropolitan Leo, On 17 August 1729 he was confirmed as the Metropolitan bishop of Kiev, Galicia, and all Ruthenia.

He consecrated following bishops Kornyliy Lebiecki, Juriy Bulhak, Felician Wolodkowicz, Stefan Olshavskyi, Havryil Blazhovskyi, Onuphrius Szumlanski, Hieronim Ustrycki, Theodosius Godebski, Jacob Augustynowicz.

Notelist

References 
 Athanasius Szeptycki at the catholic-hierarchy.org

1686 births
1746 deaths
People from Lviv Oblast
People from Ruthenian Voivodeship
Ruthenian nobility of the Polish–Lithuanian Commonwealth
Metropolitans of Kiev, Galicia and all Ruthenia (Holy See)
Athanasius